Red, White and Tuna is the third in a series of comedic plays (preceded by Greater Tuna and A Tuna Christmas and followed by Tuna Does Vegas), each set in the fictional town of Tuna, Texas, the "third-smallest" town in the state.  The plays were written by Jaston Williams, Joe Sears, and Ed Howard.  The plays are at once an affectionate comment on small-town, Southern life and attitudes but also a withering satire of same.  The plays are notable in that two men play the entire cast of nearly twenty eccentric characters of both genders and various ages.  The first play, Greater Tuna, debuted in 1981 in Austin; Red, White and Tuna debuted in 1998.

Williams and Sears regularly tour the country to perform all four plays, with Howard directing.  Of the four plays, Red, White and Tuna is notable in that Sears' and Williams' final costume change (normally done off-stage) is done in full view of the audience.

Red, White and Tuna is not currently available on VHS or DVD.

Cast of characters

(In order of respective appearance)

Performed by Williams:

Amber Windchime - Flower child, former Tuna resident
Arles Struvie - A disc jockey at radio station OKOK, now in a relationship with Bertha Bumiller
Petey Fisk - Employee of the Greater Tuna Humane Society
Charlene Bumiller - Daughter of Bertha Bumiller and brother to Stanley; now a military bride
Stanley Bumiller - Taxidermist, now residing in Albuquerque
Vera Carp - Town snob and leader of the Prayer Posse
Didi Snavely - Owner of Didi's Used Weapons ("If we can't kill it, it's immortal")
Helen Bedd - co-owner of "Helen & Inita's Hot-to-Trot Catering"
Garland Poteet - Soda dispenser and one of Helen's many boyfriends

Performed by Sears:

Star Birdfeather - Flower child, former Tuna resident
Thurston Wheelis - A disc jockey at radio station OKKK
Elmer Watkins - spokesperson for Free White Texas
Bertha Bumiller - Housewife and mother to Jody, Stanley, and Charlene, now in a relationship with Arles Struvie
Pearl Burras - Aunt to Bertha, whose potato-salad recipe is prize-winning
Joe Bob Lipsey - the "not-the-marrying-kind" director of the Tuna Little Theater
R.R. Snavely - UFOlogist and husband to Didi, now returned to Tuna
Inita Goodwin - co-owner of "Helen & Inita's Hot-to-Trot Catering"
Leonard Childers - Entrepreneur and radio personality on OKKK
The Reverend Spikes  - Now out of prison

Plot

Act I

The show begins with two new-age hippie friends, Star Birdfeather (Sears) and Amber Windchime (Williams) driving back to Tuna, Texas at night. They are returning so that they can meet with old friends due to the 4th of July Homecoming Reunion and Fireworks display. They are nervous to see the state of the town, and are also nervous as to whether or not people will remember their 'past lives' from when they still lived in their hometown. They become so upset that Amber forces Star to pull over, and they hum to calm their inner peace (Until Star attempts to hum a Nancy Sinatra song, which angers Amber). They drive on apprehensively under the cover of the night.

The next morning, local radio station OKKK signs on and the DJ's Arles Struvie (Williams) and Thurston Wheelis (Sears) begin giving the daily announcements, which are focused around the 4th of July celebrations. The hot topic of the day is the dropping out of Didi Snavely (Williams) and Pearl Burras (Sears) from the Reunion queen contest, essentially ensuring that the stuck-up Vera Carp (Williams) will win. Also mentioned are several issues which are addressed throughout the show, including the Prayer Posse (led by Vera)'s drive to censor hymns, the members of Free White Texas attempts to declare the town of Tuna a free, independent white nation, and the wedding of Arles and Bertha Bumiller (Sears) the next day. The news is suddenly hit with a new hot topic, in that gay theatre director, Joe Bob Lipsey (Sears), has stormed off from his summer production of *Red, White, and Fabulous!* due to Vera saying he cannot sing a song about alcohol in a dry county. Local animal rights activist, Petey Fisk (Williams), also makes an announcement denouncing that all creatures with more than four legs are pests.

Meanwhile, at Bertha's home, she is doing her morning cleaning when Petey knocks on the door. They converse, and Petey brings up the subject of how Bertha only has six dogs left (the seventh having just died). Bertha suspects he has brought her another dog, but he explains how it is actually a cat that thinks it is a dog. She ends ups taking it after he shows how well it fends off a pair of Jehovah's Witnesses, that Bertha dislikes because "[she] can't stand a Christian who doesn't like war." She agrees to take the cat, and sends Petey away.

Her extremely pregnant daughter, Charlene (Williams) comes down and is having one of her usual fits over her military husband, Rayford, being gone overseas. Bertha attempts to talk her down, but Charlene eventually has a tantrum over the lack of malted milk balls and locks herself in her room. Her brother, Stanley (Williams), comes downstairs hearing the commotion. They both tell Bertha that they are not going to the reunion for different reasons. Stanley leaves to go visit his Aunt Pearl. Bertha receives a call from her best friend, Vera, who has graciously offered to host the wedding at her home. Their phone call (focused on how Vera thinks Bertha should not wear white tomorrow, as "[she] is marrying a divorced man"), is constantly interrupted by Vera's menace of a son, Virgil, and one of her Hispanic maids (all named Lupe for ease of remembrance) issues with understanding Vera's cleaning instructions. Bertha ends the conversations, and writes Arles a note saying that when he arrives, he can find her at Didi's Used Weapon's Shop.

Stanley arrives at Pearl's, and he voices his issues with his mother and Arles having sex at such an old age. Pearl reassures him, saying that she did not even start enjoying her sex life until she hit 65. Disgusted, Stanley has to leave. At Didi's Used Weapons shop (motto "if we can't kill it, it's immortal!"), Joe Bob has arrived demanding to purchase a suicide weapon. She tells him she simply cannot, as she has lost too much money over the years agreeing to that, and he leaves. Pearl also arrives, and they discuss briefly how they can prevent Vera from winning, but Didi's senile mother begins to have a fit offstage, and Pearl leaves as Didi goes to attend to her.

Bertha arrives looking for Didi, but cannot find her. Arles arrives, and they begin to argue over details of the wedding and their honeymoon. The argument climaxes in Arles saying that the wedding is off, and storming out. Bertha begins to cry as Didi re-enters, and she comforts her, saying that she is sure she can find Bertha a good maiming weapon. Bertha leaves in sadness, and Didi receives a call from Pearl, who has figured out an evil plan on how to get back at Vera. Didi leaves her shop to go see her, which she is suddenly face to face with her husband R.R. Snavely (Sears), a UFOlogist, who has not been seen for many years. She is upset with him, because in one more day he would have been pronounced legally dead. She begins to scold him and he shows that he has been abducted by aliens when he snaps his fingers, and she is unable to speak. She silently yells at him as they walk offstage.

Act II

That afternoon, Pearl discovers that her car is unable to start. Virgil Carp has also stolen his mother's car, so Vera has no way to get to her coronation ceremony. They see each other, say their respective silent insults, and politely ask each other for a ride. Vera suggests that they could borrow Lupe's old stick-shift if Pearl knows how to drive it. Pearl reveals she can not only drive it, she can hot-wire it and bypass the lack of keys. After they begin their trip, Pearl suddenly wrecks the car to avoid a head-on collision. As they begin to fight, Vera realizes it is time for the coronation. They turn on the radio, and Thurston reveals that the winner, by a landslide, is Joe Bob Lipsey. Vera is aghast, stating that "this isn't the type of queen we had in mind." Pearl can only laugh, revealing that she and Didi were Joe Bob's campaign managers. The radio is suddenly overtaken by Arles, who has evicted Thurston and locked himself in the broadcast room, stating he will not to leave until Bertha takes him back. He begins to loop the Roy Orbison song "Only The Lonely", in an attempt to get her back. Vera storms off.

At the reunion plaza, ditzy Helen Bedd (Williams) and Inita Goodwin (Sears) have set up their food booth (Helen & Inita's Hot-to-Trot Catering) and are ecstatic over the boys who are returning for the reunion. Helen goes off to see one, and Inita remembers that she left her foot powder for the square-dancing competition in the car. She sets out Pearl's prize-winning potato salad, and tells one of her many dumb boyfriends, Garland (Williams) to watch the booth. The stereotypical redneck is almost incapable of running the food booth, and is constantly distracted by Virgil Carp's firecrackers near the building. Mayor Leonard Childers (Sears) runs up to the food booth, out of breath. He is frantic over his wife, Helen, having taken members of Free White Texas hostage (a subplot started in Scene II), Joe Bob's winning the reunion queen crown, and Virgil's fireworks. Garland calms him with a plate of Pearl's potato salad, which upsets Leonard's stomach. Garland says he doesn't know the issue with it, as it's "tangy, but that's the way [he] likes it." It is revealed that the potato salad has been sitting in the heat for over two hours, having spoiled it. Garland exits to find Inita.

Vera appears, wielding her megaphone. She discovers that the potato salad has gone bad, and almost disposes of it before deciding that since the town listened to Pearl, they can all just eat her potato salad and "God can sort out the rest." She is surprised when Reverend Spikes (Sears) appears, asking how long he has been out of jail. He begins to answer, and then runs off when he hears a siren, not realizing it is the sound of an ambulance, and not a police car. Joe Bob walks over, singing his formerly banned song. Vera begins to darkly insult him, before realizing she can easily dispose of him. She politely offers him a bowl of the rancid potato salad, free of charge. He eats it, and Vera quickly leaves. He realizes what has happened, and runs to find a restroom.

Helen re-enters, and gets a phone call from the maid whose car Vera stole. She says that she found Vera's lipstick in the back seat, and Helen encourages her to call the police. R.R. walks over to the food booth, saying he wants to taste one of Helen's barbecue sandwiches before he heads back out to space. Helen calls one of her girlfriends up to tell the outrageous story, and runs off to spread the rumor more. Star appears, looking for food, and is appalled at the extreme amount of cooked meat at the booth. Amber finds her, saying that she just accidentally ate a spoonful of guacamole with bacon in it, and she found it delicious. Star says she wants to see one more person, then they can go to New Mexico and get Amber cleansed. Amber leaves, and Star watches the "microcosmically militaristic" fireworks Virgil is still firing off. Stanley walks beside her, and he realizes that they used to go to school with him. They agree to head back to New Mexico together, but Stanley says he wants to see his Aunt Pearl one more time before he goes back. They leave, optimistic.

Helen and Inita quickly hear of the poisoned potato salad that has been eaten by almost every member of Tuna, Texas since they left the booth, and they decide they must leave. They pack their bags and take the potato salad away for good. Meanwhile, at Didi's, she and R.R. begin to fight again, and she enters her shop to find a weapon to kill him with. Petey arrives, with several animals that do not belong in the deserts of Texas. He explains to them that R.R. is going to take them to space, and they can come back after global warming, because the only things that will survive that are "coyotes and cockroaches. Madonna'll probably make it too." R.R. takes them, and the lights fade to the sound of a UFO taking off into space.

A radio announcement by Thurston says that the door Arles locked has been opened, and he has disappeared. Thurston says that Vera Carp has been arrested for grand theft auto and a warrant is out for Helen and Inita, but aside from that a good day was had by all. The lights return on Pearl's bedroom, where Stanley finds her proclaiming that she is on her deathbed for the potato salad affair and for wrecking Lupe's car. Stanley tries and fails to bring her to optimism, eventually saying that when she dies, her husband Henry at least won't take long to find a new wife. This puts her ornery fire back, and she shoos Stanley away so that she can find her nightgown with dogs on the front, because "it drives [Stanley's] Uncle Henry wild."

Arles and Bertha have driven to the Starlight Motel and have been eloped. They make awkward small talk, before Arles reveals a book his preacher cousin Slim gave him, which is all about healthy sexual relations. As Bertha reads it, she becomes uncomfortable, jumping at Arles' mere touch. He calms her, saying they have to put the past behind them, and move on to better things. Bertha eventually gains courage and begins to start foreplay with Arles, which leads to Arles removing his pants and chasing Bertha around the stage. They run off, and return wearing only their nightgown and wifebeater, respectively. The curtain closes on the small-town life of Tuna, Texas.

Honors for Red, White and Tuna

Nominee, Outstanding Non-Resident Production, Helen Hayes Awards Non-Resident Production, 2000

Joe Sears:
Nominee, Outstanding Lead Actor in a Touring Production, Helen Hayes Awards Non-Resident Acting, 2000

Jaston Williams:
Nominee, Outstanding Lead Actor in a Non-Resident Production, Helen Hayes Awards Non-Resident Acting, 2000

External links
Official Web Site
A Secret History of Tuna
Interview with Jaston Williams, June 18, 1995. University of Texas at San Antonio: Institute of Texan Cultures: Oral History Collection, UA 15.01, University of Texas at San Antonio Libraries Special Collections.

American plays
1998 plays
Plays set in Texas